Aquatics at the 1981 Southeast Asian Games included swimming, diving and water polo events. The three sports of aquatics were held in Malila, Philippines. Aquatics events was held between 10 December to 13 December.

Medal winners

Swimming
Men's events

Women's events

Diving

Water polo

Medal table

References

 Results The Straits Times, 11 December 1981, p. 39
 Results The Straits Times, 12 December 1981, p. 39
 Results The Straits Times 13 December 1981, p. 30

1981 Southeast Asian Games events
Southeast Asian Games
1981